This is a list of 1496 species in Xyleborus, a genus of typical bark beetles in the family Curculionidae.

Xyleborus species

A

 Xyleborus abberrans Schedl, 1959a c
 Xyleborus abbreviata Schedl, 1942a c
 Xyleborus abbreviatipennis Schedl, 1973e c
 Xyleborus abnormis Eichhoff, 1869b c
 Xyleborus abruptoides Schedl, 1955b c
 Xyleborus abruptulus Schedl, 1953f c
 Xyleborus abruptus Eggers, 1923a c
 Xyleborus abscissus Browne, 1974b c
 Xyleborus acanthodes Schedl, 1954e c
 Xyleborus acanthurus Wood & Bright, 1992 c
 Xyleborus acanthus Schedl, 1952i c
 Xyleborus accomodatus Schedl, 1966f c
 Xyleborus aceris Kurenzov, 1941a c
 Xyleborus aclinis Wood, 1974a c
 Xyleborus acuminatus Schedl, 1970e c
 Xyleborus acuticornis Schedl, 1957d c
 Xyleborus acutus Schedl, 1975f c
 Xyleborus adamsoni Beeson, 1935a c
 Xyleborus addendus Schedl, 1964e c
 Xyleborus adelographus Eichhoff, 1868a c
 Xyleborus adjunctus Eggers, 1924 c
 Xyleborus adossuarius Schedl, 1952b c
 Xyleborus adspersus Schedl, 1958k c
 Xyleborus adumbratus Blandford, 1894d c
 Xyleborus adunculus Schedl, 1961e c
 Xyleborus aduncus Schedl, 1961e c
 Xyleborus adusticollis Wood & Bright, 1992 c
 Xyleborus adustus Eggers, 1923a c
 Xyleborus aegir Eggers, 1922b c
 Xyleborus aequalis Wood & Bright, 1992 c
 Xyleborus aequatorensis Eggers, 1940b c
 Xyleborus aesculi Ferrari, 1867a c
 Xyleborus affinis Eichhoff, 1868 i c b  (sugarcane shot-hole borer)
 Xyleborus africanus Eggers, 1927a c
 Xyleborus agamus Perkins, 1900 i c
 Xyleborus agathis Browne, 1984b c
 Xyleborus aglaiae Browne, 1984a c
 Xyleborus agnaticeps Schedl, 1957d c
 Xyleborus agnatus Eggers, 1923a c
 Xyleborus agraphus Schedl, 1977f c
 Xyleborus albizzianus Schedl, 1950d c
 Xyleborus algidus Schedl, 1979b c
 Xyleborus alienus Schedl, 1977c c
 Xyleborus allecta Schedl, 1942d c
 Xyleborus alluaudi Schaufuss, C.F.C., 1897a c
 Xyleborus alni Niisima, 1909 c
 Xyleborus alpha Beeson, 1929 c
 Xyleborus alpinus Schedl, 1957d c
 Xyleborus alsapanicus Schedl, 1951i c
 Xyleborus alter Eggers, 1931a c
 Xyleborus alternans Eichhoff, 1869a c
 Xyleborus altilis Schedl, 1966f c
 Xyleborus amanicus Hagedorn, 1910b c
 Xyleborus amarantum Schedl, 1942a c
 Xyleborus ambasinotatus Schedl, 1978c c
 Xyleborus ambasipennis Schedl, 1957d c
 Xyleborus ambasius Hagedorn, 1912a c
 Xyleborus ambasiusculus Eggers, 1920 c
 Xyleborus amoenus Schedl, 1948f c
 Xyleborus amorphus Eggers, 1926b c
 Xyleborus amphicauda Browne, 1986c c
 Xyleborus amphicranoides Hagedorn, 1908 c
 Xyleborus amphicranulus Eggers, 1923a c
 Xyleborus amplexicauda Hagedorn, 1910b c
 Xyleborus amplicollis Eichhoff, 1869a c
 Xyleborus amputatus Blandford, 1894c c
 Xyleborus analis Schedl, 1973e c
 Xyleborus analogus Schedl, 1948f c
 Xyleborus andamanensis Blandford, 1896b c
 Xyleborus andrewesi Blandford, 1896b c
 Xyleborus andriani Schedl, 1965c c
 Xyleborus anepotulus Eggers, 1940d c
 Xyleborus angolensis Schedl, 1959p c
 Xyleborus angustatulus Schedl, 1942d c
 Xyleborus angustatus Eichhoff, 1866 c
 Xyleborus angustior Eggers, 1925 c
 Xyleborus anisandrus Schedl, 1954b c
 Xyleborus anisopterae Browne, 1983a c
 Xyleborus ankius Schedl, 1975f c
 Xyleborus annectens Schedl, 1957d c
 Xyleborus annexus Schedl, 1973e c
 Xyleborus anomalus Schedl, 1955b c
 Xyleborus anoplum Schedl, 1975f c
 Xyleborus antaisaka Schedl, 1953d c
 Xyleborus antanala Schedl, 1953d c
 Xyleborus apertus Schedl, 1939e c
 Xyleborus apicalis Blandford, 1894d c
 Xyleborus apicenotatus Schedl, 1971c c
 Xyleborus apicipenne Schedl, 1974d c
 Xyleborus apiculatus Schedl, 1942a c
 Xyleborus aplanatideclivis Schedl, 1942c c
 Xyleborus aplanatus Wichmann, H.E., 1914a c
 Xyleborus approximatus Schedl, 1951i c
 Xyleborus aquilus Blandford, 1894d c
 Xyleborus araguensis Wood, 2007 c
 Xyleborus araujiae Brèthes, 1921b c
 Xyleborus arbuti Hopkins, 1915b c
 Xyleborus arcticollis Blandford, 1896b c
 Xyleborus arcturus Samuelson, 1981 i c
 Xyleborus arduus Schedl, 1942a c
 Xyleborus argentinensis Schedl, 1931c c
 Xyleborus aries Schedl, 1969b c
 Xyleborus armaticeps Schedl, 1942a c
 Xyleborus armatus Schaufuss, C.F.C., 1891 c
 Xyleborus armifer Schedl, 1942c c
 Xyleborus armiger Schedl, 1953e c
 Xyleborus armillatus Schedl, 1933d c
 Xyleborus arquatus Sampson, 1912 c
 Xyleborus artecomans Schedl, 1953e c
 Xyleborus artecuneolus Schedl, 1939n c
 Xyleborus artecylindrus Schedl, 1942a c
 Xyleborus artegranulatus Schedl, 1937b c
 Xyleborus artegrapha Schedl, 1942d c
 Xyleborus artehybridus Schedl, 1951i c
 Xyleborus artelaevis Schedl, 1942a c
 Xyleborus artelineatus Beeson, 1929 c
 Xyleborus artelongus Schedl, 1957d c
 Xyleborus artemarginatus Schedl, 1975a c
 Xyleborus artespinulosus Schedl, 1935d c
 Xyleborus artestriatus Eichhoff, 1878b c
 Xyleborus artetenuis Schedl, 1973a c
 Xyleborus artifex Schedl, 1942d c
 Xyleborus ashuensis Murayama, 1954b c
 Xyleborus asper Eggers, 1933b c
 Xyleborus asperatus Blandford, 1895a c
 Xyleborus aspericauda Eggers, 1941a c
 Xyleborus asperipennis Eggers, 1934b c
 Xyleborus asperipunctatus Eggers, 1933b c
 Xyleborus asperrimus Schedl, 1975a c
 Xyleborus aspersus Sampson, 1921 c
 Xyleborus asperulus Eggers, 1931a c
 Xyleborus assamensis Eggers, 1930d c
 Xyleborus assiduus Schedl, 1961i c
 Xyleborus assimilis Eggers, 1927b c
 Xyleborus associatus Schedl, 1976a c
 Xyleborus astutus Schedl, 1954a c
 Xyleborus atava Schedl, 1979g c
 Xyleborus ater Eggers, 1923a c
 Xyleborus aterrimus Eggers, 1927b c
 Xyleborus atlanticus Bright & Torres, 2006 c
 Xyleborus atratus Eichhoff, 1875 c
 Xyleborus attenuatus Blandford, 1894d c
 Xyleborus auratus Eggers, 1923a c
 Xyleborus aurilegulus Schaufuss, C.F.C., 1897b c
 Xyleborus australis Schedl, 1980b c

B

 Xyleborus baculum Beeson, 1929 c
 Xyleborus badius Eichhoff, 1869a c
 Xyleborus balanocarpi Nunberg, 1961b c
 Xyleborus balbalanus Eggers, 1927c c
 Xyleborus bambesanus Eggers, 1940c c
 Xyleborus banjoewangi Schedl, 1939f c
 Xyleborus banksiae Schedl, 1964d c
 Xyleborus barbatogranosus Schedl, 1942d c
 Xyleborus barbatoides Schedl, 1971c c
 Xyleborus barbatulus Schedl, 1934d c
 Xyleborus barbatus Hagedorn, 1910b c
 Xyleborus barumbuensis Eggers, 1924 c
 Xyleborus basalis Schedl, 1972e c
 Xyleborus batoensis Eggers, 1923a c
 Xyleborus beckeri Bright, 1972d c
 Xyleborus bella Sampson, 1921 c
 Xyleborus benguetensis Schedl, 1951i c
 Xyleborus betsileo Schedl, 1965c c
 Xyleborus bezanozano Schedl, 1961e c
 Xyleborus bicinctulus Schedl, 1974f c
 Xyleborus bicinctum Schedl, 1965c c
 Xyleborus bicinctus Schedl, 1972g c
 Xyleborus bicolor Blandford, 1894d c
 Xyleborus biconicus Eggers, 1928c c
 Xyleborus bicornatulus Wood, 1967c c
 Xyleborus bicornioides Schedl, 1952b c
 Xyleborus bicornis Eggers, 1923a c
 Xyleborus bicornutus Wood, 1974a c
 Xyleborus bicostatus Sampson, 1921 c
 Xyleborus bicuspis Eggers, 1940d c
 Xyleborus bidentatus Wood & Bright, 1992 c
 Xyleborus bimaculatus Eggers, 1927c c
 Xyleborus biographus LeConte, 1868 c
 Xyleborus birmanus Eggers, 1930d c
 Xyleborus biseriatus Schedl, 1963d c
 Xyleborus bismarcensis Browne, 1966 c
 Xyleborus bispinatus Eichhoff, 1868c c b
 Xyleborus bispinosulus Schedl, 1961c c
 Xyleborus bispinus Nobuchi, 1981d c
 Xyleborus bituberculatum Eggers, 1923a c
 Xyleborus biuncus Browne, 1984d c
 Xyleborus blandus Schedl, 1954c c
 Xyleborus bobiriae Schedl, 1957e c
 Xyleborus bodoanus Reitter, 1913a c
 Xyleborus boeni Schedl, 1953d c
 Xyleborus bolivianus Eggers, 1943a c
 Xyleborus borneensis Eggers, 1927c c
 Xyleborus bostrichoides Schedl, 1956a c
 Xyleborus brasiliensis Eggers, 1928c c
 Xyleborus brevicollis Browne, 1984d c
 Xyleborus brevidentatus Eggers, 1930d c
 Xyleborus brevipennis Schedl, 1971c c
 Xyleborus brevipilosus Eggers, 1940d c
 Xyleborus brevis Eichhoff, 1877a c
 Xyleborus brevius Eggers, 1923a c
 Xyleborus breviusculus Schedl, 1942a c
 Xyleborus brighti Schedl, 1974f c
 Xyleborus brownei Schedl, 1964k c
 Xyleborus brunneipes Eggers, 1940d c
 Xyleborus brunneus Browne, 1981b c
 Xyleborus bryanti Sampson, 1919 c
 Xyleborus bucco Schaufuss, C.F.C., 1897a c
 Xyleborus burgdorfi Hopkins, 1915b c
 Xyleborus burmanicus Beeson, 1930 c
 Xyleborus buscki Hopkins, 1915b c
 Xyleborus butamali Beeson, 1930 c
 Xyleborus buxtoni Beeson, 1929 c

C

 Xyleborus cachani Schedl, 1958j c
 Xyleborus cachoeirinhae Schedl, 1951m c
 Xyleborus cacuminatus Eggers, 1928c c
 Xyleborus caelator Browne, 1955 c
 Xyleborus caelebs Blandford, 1898b c
 Xyleborus calamoides Murayama, 1934c c
 Xyleborus caldensis Wood, 2007 c
 Xyleborus californicus Wood, 1975 i c
 Xyleborus calvus Schedl, 1942a c
 Xyleborus camela Eggers, 1940d c
 Xyleborus camerunus Hagedorn, 1910b c
 Xyleborus camopinus Hagedorn, 1903b c
 Xyleborus camphorae Hagedorn, 1908 c
 Xyleborus canadensis Swaine, J.M., 1917 c
 Xyleborus canarii Browne, 1984a c
 Xyleborus canarivorus Browne, 1986a c
 Xyleborus cancellatus Eggers, 1936e c
 Xyleborus canus Niisima, 1909 c
 Xyleborus capensis Eggers, 1944b c
 Xyleborus capito Schaufuss, C.F.C., 1897a c
 Xyleborus capucinoides Eggers, 1941a c
 Xyleborus capucinus Eichhoff, 1869b c
 Xyleborus caraibicus Eggers, 1941a c
 Xyleborus carbonarius Eggers, 1927a c
 Xyleborus carinensis Eggers, 1923a c
 Xyleborus carinipennis Eichhoff, 1868c c
 Xyleborus carinulatus Eggers, 1920 c
 Xyleborus catharinensis Eggers, 1928c c
 Xyleborus catulus Blandford, 1898b c
 Xyleborus caudatus Schedl, 1957d c
 Xyleborus cavatus Browne, 1980c c
 Xyleborus cavuloides Browne, 1984c c
 Xyleborus cavulus Browne, 1974b c
 Xyleborus celsoides Hagedorn, 1908 c
 Xyleborus celsus Eichhoff, 1868 i c b
 Xyleborus ceramensis Schedl, 1937e c
 Xyleborus cerasi Eggers, 1937b c
 Xyleborus chimbui Schedl, 1973f c
 Xyleborus chrysophylli Eggers, 1930d c
 Xyleborus chujoi Schedl, 1951i c
 Xyleborus ciliatoformis Schedl, 1953f c
 Xyleborus ciliatus Eggers, 1940d c
 Xyleborus cinchonae Veen, H., 1897 c
 Xyleborus cinctipennis Schedl, 1980b c
 Xyleborus cinctipes Schedl, 1979g c
 Xyleborus circulicauda Browne, 1974a c
 Xyleborus circumcisulus Schedl, 1954a c
 Xyleborus circumcisum Sampson, 1921 c
 Xyleborus circumdentatus Schedl, 1938h c
 Xyleborus circumspinosus Schedl, 1972i c
 Xyleborus citri Beeson, 1930 c
 Xyleborus clerodendronae Schedl, 1952i c
 Xyleborus coartatus Sampson, 1921 c
 Xyleborus coccotrypoides Eggers, 1943a c
 Xyleborus cofeicola Campos Novaes, 1922 c
 Xyleborus coffeae Wurth, T., 1908 c
 Xyleborus coffeiceus Schedl, 1951b c
 Xyleborus coffeivorus Weele, H.W. van der, 1910 c
 Xyleborus cognatus Blandford, 1896a c
 Xyleborus collaris Eggers, 1923a c
 Xyleborus collarti Eggers, 1932d c
 Xyleborus collis Niisima, 1910a c
 Xyleborus colossus Blandford, 1896b c
 Xyleborus comans Sampson, 1919 c
 Xyleborus commixtus Blandford, 1898b c
 Xyleborus compactus Eichhoff, 1875 c
 Xyleborus comparabilis Schedl, 1957d c
 Xyleborus comptus Sampson, 1919 c
 Xyleborus concentus Wood, 1974a c
 Xyleborus concinnus Beeson, 1930 c
 Xyleborus concisus Blandford, 1894d c
 Xyleborus concitatus Schedl, 1969a c
 Xyleborus conditus Schedl, 1971c c
 Xyleborus confinis Eggers, 1923a c
 Xyleborus confluens Schedl, 1966f c
 Xyleborus conformis Schedl (Kollar in), 1962j c
 Xyleborus confusus Eichhoff, 1868a c
 Xyleborus congonus Hagedorn, 1908 c
 Xyleborus congruens Schedl, 1966f c
 Xyleborus conidens Eggers, 1936d c
 Xyleborus conifer Hagedorn, 1905 c
 Xyleborus conradti Hagedorn, 1910b c
 Xyleborus consimilis Eggers, 1923a c
 Xyleborus consobrinus Eggers, 1932d c
 Xyleborus conspeciens Schedl, 1936i c
 Xyleborus conspectus Schedl, 1964g c
 Xyleborus consularis Schedl, 1955b c
 Xyleborus continentalis Eggers, 1920 c
 Xyleborus convexicauda Eggers, 1932d c
 Xyleborus cordatus Hagedorn, 1910b c
 Xyleborus corniculatulus Schedl, 1948f c
 Xyleborus corniculatus Schedl, 1948f c
 Xyleborus cornivorus Murayama, 1950c c
 Xyleborus cornutus Schaufuss, C.F.C., 1891 c
 Xyleborus coronatus Eichhoff, 1878b c
 Xyleborus corporaali Eggers, 1923a c
 Xyleborus corpulentus Eggers, 1930d c
 Xyleborus corrugatum Schedl, 1951i c
 Xyleborus corruptus Schedl, 1962j c
 Xyleborus corthyloides Schedl, 1934d c
 Xyleborus costaricensis Blandford, 1898b c
 Xyleborus costatomorphus Schedl, 1950g c
 Xyleborus costipennis Schedl, 1959a c
 Xyleborus costulatus Eggers, 1940d c
 Xyleborus covinus Reitter, 1913a c
 Xyleborus crassitarsus Schedl, 1936j c
 Xyleborus crassus Hagedorn, 1910b c
 Xyleborus crenatus Eggers, 1920 c
 Xyleborus crenulatus Eggers, 1920 c
 Xyleborus cribratus Eggers, 1940d c
 Xyleborus cribripennis Eggers, 1927a c
 Xyleborus crinitulus Wood, 1974a c
 Xyleborus crinitus Schedl, 1962j c
 Xyleborus cristatuloides Schedl, 1971a c
 Xyleborus cristatus Hagedorn, 1908 c
 Xyleborus criticus Schedl, 1950g c
 Xyleborus cruciatus Schedl, 1973e c
 Xyleborus crucifer Hagedorn, 1908 c
 Xyleborus cruciferinum Schedl, 1957d c
 Xyleborus cruciforme Schedl, 1957d c
 Xyleborus crucipenne Schedl, 1962j c
 Xyleborus cruralis Schedl, 1975e c
 Xyleborus cryphaloides Schedl, 1942a c
 Xyleborus cryptographus Wood & Bright, 1992 c
 Xyleborus cucullatus Blandford, 1894d c
 Xyleborus cuneatus Eichhoff, 1878b c
 Xyleborus cuneidentis Schedl, 1961e c
 Xyleborus cuneiformis Schedl, 1958b c
 Xyleborus cuneipennis Schedl, 1950d c
 Xyleborus cuneolosus Schedl, 1959a c
 Xyleborus cuneolus Eggers, 1927c c
 Xyleborus cupulatus Schedl, 1961e c
 Xyleborus curtidentis Schedl, 1961e c
 Xyleborus curtuloides Eggers, 1941a c
 Xyleborus curtulus Eichhoff, 1869a c
 Xyleborus curtus Eggers, 1928c c
 Xyleborus curvatus Browne, 1986a c
 Xyleborus curvidentis Schedl, 1958b c
 Xyleborus curvipenne Schedl, 1951i c
 Xyleborus cuspidus Schedl, 1975f c
 Xyleborus cyclopus Schedl, 1940b c
 Xyleborus cylindrica Eggers, 1927c c
 Xyleborus cylindriformis Schedl, 1942c c
 Xyleborus cylindripennis Schedl, 1954a c
 Xyleborus cylindromorphus Eggers, 1927c c
 Xyleborus cylindrus Schedl, 1951i c

D

 Xyleborus dalbergiae Eggers, 1930d c
 Xyleborus daosi Schedl, 1958j c
 Xyleborus darwini Schedl, 1972a c
 Xyleborus dasyurus Browne, 1950b c
 Xyleborus dearmatus Eggers, 1923a c
 Xyleborus decipiens Eggers, 1923a c
 Xyleborus declivigranulatus Schedl, 1936j c
 Xyleborus declivis Eichhoff, 1869a c
 Xyleborus declivispinatus Schedl, 1969b c
 Xyleborus decorus Schedl, 1960i c
 Xyleborus decumans Schedl, 1953c c
 Xyleborus defensus Blandford, 1894d c
 Xyleborus deformatus Browne, 1974a c
 Xyleborus delicatum Schedl, 1955b c
 Xyleborus demissus Wood, 1974a c
 Xyleborus densatus Schedl, 1979g c
 Xyleborus denseseriatus Eggers, 1941b c
 Xyleborus densicornis Schedl, 1957d c
 Xyleborus dentatulus Browne, 1981a c
 Xyleborus dentatus Blandford, 1895a c
 Xyleborus dentellus Schedl, 1953d c
 Xyleborus dentibaris Schedl, 1961e c
 Xyleborus denticulus Mandelshtam & Nikitsky, 2010 c
 Xyleborus dentipennis Browne, 1983a c
 Xyleborus deplanatulus Schedl, 1950f c
 Xyleborus deplanatus Eggers, 1933b c
 Xyleborus depressurus Browne, 1985a c
 Xyleborus derelictus Hagedorn, 1910b c
 Xyleborus derupteterminatus Schedl, 1951i c
 Xyleborus deruptulus Schedl, 1942d c
 Xyleborus desertus Schedl, 1971c c
 Xyleborus despectus Schedl, 1975j c
 Xyleborus destrictum Schedl, 1939e c
 Xyleborus destruens Blandford, 1896b c
 Xyleborus detectus Schedl, 1975a c
 Xyleborus detritus Eggers, 1927b c
 Xyleborus devexulus Wood, 1978b c
 Xyleborus devexus Wood, 1977b c
 Xyleborus devius Schedl, 1979g c
 Xyleborus diapiformis Schedl, 1961e c
 Xyleborus dichrous Eichhoff, 1868c c
 Xyleborus difficilis Eggers, 1923a c
 Xyleborus diglyptus Schedl, 1956a c
 Xyleborus dihingensis Schedl, 1951i c
 Xyleborus dilatatiformis Schedl, 1971a c
 Xyleborus dilatatulus Schedl, 1953b c
 Xyleborus dilatatus Eichhoff, 1878b c
 Xyleborus diligens Schedl, 1957d c
 Xyleborus dimidiatus Eggers, 1927b c
 Xyleborus discolor Blandford, 1898a c
 Xyleborus discrepans Schedl, 1950d c
 Xyleborus discretus Eggers, 1933b c
 Xyleborus dispar Wood & Bright, 1992 c
 Xyleborus dissidens Wood, 1974a c
 Xyleborus dissimulatus Wood, 1974a c
 Xyleborus distinguendus Eggers, 1930d c
 Xyleborus diversepilosus Eggers, 1941b c
 Xyleborus diversicolor Eggers, 1923a c
 Xyleborus diversipennis Schedl, 1951j c
 Xyleborus diversus Schedl, 1954e c
 Xyleborus docta Schedl, 1975f c
 Xyleborus doliaris Schedl, 1959a c
 Xyleborus dolosus Blandford, 1896b c
 Xyleborus donisthorpi Schedl, 1951i c
 Xyleborus dorsalis Schedl, 1965g c
 Xyleborus dorsosulcatus Beeson, 1930 c
 Xyleborus dossuarius Eggers, 1923a c
 Xyleborus dryographus Wood & Bright, 1992 c g
 Xyleborus dubiosus Perkins, 1900 i c
 Xyleborus dubius Eggers, 1923a c
 Xyleborus duodecimspinatus Schedl, 1936g c
 Xyleborus duplex Browne, 1974a c
 Xyleborus duplicatus Eggers, 1923a c
 Xyleborus duploarmatus Browne, 1962c c
 Xyleborus duponti Montrouzier, 1861 c
 Xyleborus duprezi Hoffmann, A., 1936 c

E-F

 Xyleborus ebenus Wood, 1971 c
 Xyleborus ebriosus Niisima, 1909 c
 Xyleborus eccoptopterus Schedl, 1951k c
 Xyleborus eggersi Beeson, 1930 c
 Xyleborus eggersianus Schedl, 1960i c
 Xyleborus eichhoffi Schreiner, 1882 c
 Xyleborus eichhoffianus Schedl, 1950h c
 Xyleborus elegans Sampson, 1923b c
 Xyleborus elevatus Eggers, 1931a c
 Xyleborus elongatus Eggers, 1920 c
 Xyleborus emarginatus Schedl, 1952k c
 Xyleborus erinacea Eggers, 1927c c
 Xyleborus erygraphus (Ratzeburg, 1837) g
 Xyleborus eucalyptica Schedl, 1938f c
 Xyleborus eugeniae Eggers, 1930d c
 Xyleborus eupatorii Eggers, 1940d c
 Xyleborus eurygraphus Wood & Bright, 1992 c g
 Xyleborus exactus Schedl, 1964i c
 Xyleborus exaratus Blandford, 1898b c
 Xyleborus excavatus Hagedorn, 1907b c
 Xyleborus excavus Schedl, 1964g c
 Xyleborus exesus Blandford, 1894d c
 Xyleborus exilis Schedl, 1934e c
 Xyleborus eximius Schedl, 1970b c
 Xyleborus exsculpta Eggers, 1927c c
 Xyleborus exsectus Perkins, 1900 i c
 Xyleborus extensa Schedl, 1955b c
 Xyleborus exutus Wood, 1974a c
 Xyleborus fabricii Schedl, 1964k c
 Xyleborus facetus Schedl, 1965f c
 Xyleborus falcarius Schedl, 1942c c
 Xyleborus fallaciosus Schedl, 1957d c
 Xyleborus fallax Eichhoff, 1878b c
 Xyleborus fallaxoides Schedl, 1955b c
 Xyleborus falsus Schedl, 1966f c
 Xyleborus familiaris Schedl, 1965c c
 Xyleborus fastigatus Schedl, 1935b c
 Xyleborus felix Schedl, 1971g c
 Xyleborus femoratus Eggers, 1928c c
 Xyleborus ferinus Schedl, 1936j c
 Xyleborus ferox Blandford, 1898b c
 Xyleborus ferrugineus (Fabricius, 1801) i c b
 Xyleborus festivus Eichhoff, 1875 c
 Xyleborus ficus Eggers, 1927a c
 Xyleborus figuratus Schedl, 1959a c
 Xyleborus fijianus Schedl, 1938f c
 Xyleborus filiformis Schedl, 1975f c
 Xyleborus fischeri Hagedorn, 1908 c
 Xyleborus fitchi Hopkins, 1915b c
 Xyleborus flavipennis Schedl, 1979g c
 Xyleborus flavopilosus Schedl, 1936g c
 Xyleborus flexiocostatus Schedl, 1942d c
 Xyleborus flohri Schedl, 1972g c
 Xyleborus floridensis Hopkins, 1915b c
 Xyleborus foederatus Schedl, 1963f c
 Xyleborus foersteri Hagedorn, 1910b c
 Xyleborus forcipatus Schedl, 1957d c
 Xyleborus forficatus Schedl, 1957d c
 Xyleborus forficuloides Schedl, 1951j c
 Xyleborus forficulus Eggers, 1922b c
 Xyleborus formosae Wood, 1992a c
 Xyleborus formosanus Eggers, 1930d c
 Xyleborus fornicatior Eggers, 1923a c
 Xyleborus fornicatus Eichhoff, 1868c c
 Xyleborus fouqueti Schedl, 1937f c
 Xyleborus foveicollis Browne, 1950b c
 Xyleborus fragosus Schedl, 1942d c
 Xyleborus fraterculus Schaufuss, C.F.C., 1905 c
 Xyleborus fraternus Blandford, 1896b c
 Xyleborus frigidus Blackburn, 1885 c
 Xyleborus fukiensis Eggers, 1941b c
 Xyleborus fulgens Schedl, 1975f c
 Xyleborus fuliginosus Eggers, 1923a c
 Xyleborus fulvulus Schedl, 1942d c
 Xyleborus fulvus Murayama, 1936a c
 Xyleborus funebris Schedl, 1976a c
 Xyleborus funereus Lea, 1910 c
 Xyleborus funestus Schedl, 1979g c
 Xyleborus fuscatus Eichhoff, 1868a c
 Xyleborus fuscipilosus Eggers, 1940d c
 Xyleborus fusciseriatus Eggers, 1934a c
 Xyleborus fuscobrunneus Eichhoff, 1878b c
 Xyleborus fuscus Eggers, 1923a c
 Xyleborus fuyugei Schedl, 1973f c

G-H

 Xyleborus galeatus Blandford, 1894d c
 Xyleborus ganshoensis Murayama, 1952a c
 Xyleborus geayi Hagedorn, 1905a c
 Xyleborus geminatus Hagedorn, 1904d c
 Xyleborus gentilis Schedl, 1972g c
 Xyleborus germanus Blandford, 1894d c
 Xyleborus gezei Lepesme, 1942c c
 Xyleborus gibber Schedl, 1961e c
 Xyleborus gilvipes Blandford, 1898b c
 Xyleborus glaber Eggers, 1930d c
 Xyleborus glaberrimus Schedl, 1942c c
 Xyleborus glabratulus Browne, 1983a c
 Xyleborus glabratus Eichhoff, 1877a c b  (redbay ambrosia beetle)
 Xyleborus glabripennis Schedl, 1942a c
 Xyleborus glaucus Sampson, 1921 c
 Xyleborus globus Blandford, 1896b c
 Xyleborus godmani Blandford, 1898b c
 Xyleborus goloanus Browne, 1974a c
 Xyleborus gorggae Schedl, 1973e c
 Xyleborus gorontalosa Schedl, 1939f c
 Xyleborus gracilicornis Schedl, 1977e c
 Xyleborus gracilipennis Schedl, 1957d c
 Xyleborus gracilis Eichhoff, 1868c c
 Xyleborus granatus Schedl, 1979a c
 Xyleborus grandis Eichhoff, 1869a c
 Xyleborus granicollis LeConte, 1868 c
 Xyleborus granifer Eichhoff, 1878b c
 Xyleborus graniger Schedl, 1955b c
 Xyleborus granistriatus Eggers, 1940d c
 Xyleborus granosus Schedl, 1957d c
 Xyleborus granularis Schedl, 1950g c
 Xyleborus granulicauda Eggers, 1931a c
 Xyleborus granulifer Eggers, 1923a c
 Xyleborus granulipennis Eggers, 1930d c
 Xyleborus granulipes Schedl, 1973e c
 Xyleborus granulosus Schedl, 1975f c
 Xyleborus granurus Browne, 1980a c
 Xyleborus gratiosus Schedl, 1975f c
 Xyleborus gratus Schedl, 1964g c
 Xyleborus gravelyi Wichmann, H.E., 1914a c
 Xyleborus gravidus Blandford, 1898a c
 Xyleborus grenadensis Hopkins, 1915b c
 Xyleborus grossmanni Schedl, 1952d c
 Xyleborus grossopunctatus Schedl, 1942d c
 Xyleborus guanajuatensis Dugès, 1887 c
 Xyleborus guayanensis Eggers, 1933b c
 Xyleborus guineense Eggers, 1941d c
 Xyleborus gundlachi Eggers, 1931a c
 Xyleborus haberkorni Eggers, 1920 c
 Xyleborus haddeni Schedl, 1933e c
 Xyleborus haesitus Schedl, 1976a c
 Xyleborus hagedorni Iglesias, 1914b c
 Xyleborus hagedornianus Schedl, 1952k c
 Xyleborus halli Schedl, 1954c c
 Xyleborus hamatus LeConte, 1874a c
 Xyleborus hashimotoi Browne, 1986a c
 Xyleborus hastatum Schedl, 1942d c
 Xyleborus hatanakai Browne, 1983a c
 Xyleborus hawaiiensis Perkins, 1900 i c
 Xyleborus hembebitalei Schedl, 1962j c
 Xyleborus heveae Schedl, 1957d c
 Xyleborus hiiaka Samuelson, 1981 i c
 Xyleborus hirsutipennis Schedl, 1961e c
 Xyleborus hirtellus Schedl, 1948f c
 Xyleborus hirtipennis Eggers, 1940d c
 Xyleborus hirtipes Schedl, 1969c c
 Xyleborus hirtum Hagedorn, 1904d c
 Xyleborus hirtuosus Beeson, 1930 c
 Xyleborus holtzi Eggers, 1922b c
 Xyleborus hopeae Browne, 1986a c
 Xyleborus hopkinsi Beeson, 1929 c
 Xyleborus horridatus Wood, 1967c c
 Xyleborus horridicus Wood, 1967c c
 Xyleborus horridulus Browne, 1961a c
 Xyleborus horridus Eichhoff, 1869 i c b
 Xyleborus hova Schedl, 1953d c
 Xyleborus howardi Hopkins, 1915b c
 Xyleborus howdenae Bright, 1973 c
 Xyleborus huangi Browne, 1983d c
 Xyleborus hubbardi Hopkins, 1915b c
 Xyleborus hunanensis Browne, 1983d c
 Xyleborus hybridus Eggers, 1927c c
 Xyleborus hystricoides Browne, 1973a c
 Xyleborus hystrix Schedl, 1957d c

I

 Xyleborus ignobilis Perkins, 1900 i c
 Xyleborus iheringi Iglesias, 1914b c
 Xyleborus illepidus Schedl, 1941d c
 Xyleborus illustrius Schedl, 1939f c
 Xyleborus imbellis Blandford, 1898b c
 Xyleborus imitator Schedl, 1976a c
 Xyleborus immaturus Blackburn, 1885 c
 Xyleborus immersus Schedl, 1972i c
 Xyleborus immitatrix Schedl, 1975f c
 Xyleborus impar Eggers, 1927c c
 Xyleborus impexus Schedl, 1942c c
 Xyleborus impressus Eichhoff, 1868a c b
 Xyleborus improbus Sampson, 1913 c
 Xyleborus improcerus Sampson, 1921 c
 Xyleborus improvidus Schedl, 1935d c
 Xyleborus inaequalis Schedl, 1934d c
 Xyleborus inaffectatus Schedl, 1972g c
 Xyleborus incertus Wood, 2007 c
 Xyleborus inconstans Schedl, 1962j c
 Xyleborus inconveniens Schedl, 1948h c
 Xyleborus incultus Wood, 1975b c
 Xyleborus incurvus Eggers, 1930d c
 Xyleborus indicus Eichhoff, 1878b c
 Xyleborus indigens Schedl, 1955b c
 Xyleborus indocorus Schedl, 1979a c
 Xyleborus indonesianus Browne, 1984b c
 Xyleborus industrius Sampson, 1912 c
 Xyleborus inermis Eichhoff, 1868a c
 Xyleborus infans Hagedorn, 1910b c
 Xyleborus inferior Schedl, 1976a c
 Xyleborus innominatus Schedl, 1970d c
 Xyleborus inoblitus Schedl, 1939g c
 Xyleborus inopinatus Schedl, 1970e c
 Xyleborus insignis Browne, 1984c c
 Xyleborus insitivus Schedl, 1959a c
 Xyleborus insolitus Bright, 1972d c
 Xyleborus insularis Sharp, D., 1885 c
 Xyleborus insulindicus Eggers, 1923a c
 Xyleborus integer Schedl, 1957d c
 Xyleborus interjectus Blandford, 1894 i c
 Xyleborus intermedius Eggers, 1923a c
 Xyleborus interponens Schedl, 1954c c
 Xyleborus interpunctatus Blandford, 1898b c
 Xyleborus interruptus Eggers, 1940d c
 Xyleborus intersetosus Blandford, 1898b c
 Xyleborus interstitialis Eichhoff, 1878b c
 Xyleborus intextus Beeson, 1930 c
 Xyleborus intricatus Schedl, 1948f c
 Xyleborus intrusus Blandford, 1898 i c b
 Xyleborus inurbanus Bright & Skidmore, 2002 c
 Xyleborus ipidia Schedl, 1972h c
 Xyleborus irregularis Eggers, 1923a c
 Xyleborus ishidai Niisima, 1909 c
 Xyleborus itatiayaensis Schedl, 1936i c
 Xyleborus izuensis Murayama, 1952a c

J-K

 Xyleborus jaintianus Schedl, 1967f c
 Xyleborus jamaicensis Bright, 1972d c
 Xyleborus jambolanaensis Schedl, 1951j c
 Xyleborus japonicus Nobuchi, 1981d c
 Xyleborus javanus Eggers, 1923a c
 Xyleborus jongaensis Schedl, 1941d c
 Xyleborus joveri Schedl, 1951f c
 Xyleborus jucundus Schedl, 1954a c
 Xyleborus judenkoi Schedl, 1959a c
 Xyleborus justus Schedl, 1931c c
 Xyleborus kadoyamaensis Murayama, 1934c c
 Xyleborus kaimochii Nobuchi, 1981d c
 Xyleborus kajangensis Schedl, 1942a c
 Xyleborus kalopanacis Kurenzov, 1941a c
 Xyleborus katangensis Eggers, 1932d c
 Xyleborus katoi Browne, 1986c c
 Xyleborus kauaiensis Perkins, 1900 i c
 Xyleborus kelantanum Schedl, 1953c c
 Xyleborus kersianus Browne, 1981a c
 Xyleborus khayae Schedl, 1957e c
 Xyleborus khinganensis Murayama, 1943b c
 Xyleborus kirishimanus Murayama, 1955 c
 Xyleborus kivuensis Eggers, 1935c c
 Xyleborus klapperichi Schedl, 1955h c
 Xyleborus kojimai Murayama, 1936a c
 Xyleborus kororensis Wood, 1960a c
 Xyleborus kraatzi Eichhoff, 1868c c
 Xyleborus kraunhiae Niisima, 1910a c
 Xyleborus kuchingensis Browne, 1955 c
 Xyleborus kumamotoensis Murayama, 1934c c

L

 Xyleborus laciniatus Hagedorn, 1910b c
 Xyleborus lacunatus Wood, 1974a c
 Xyleborus laetus Niisima, 1909 c
 Xyleborus laevipennis Schedl, 1961e c
 Xyleborus laevis Eggers, 1923a c
 Xyleborus laeviusculus Blandford, 1896a c
 Xyleborus lanaiensis Perkins, 1900 i c
 Xyleborus latecarinatus Schedl, 1936d c
 Xyleborus latecavatus Eggers, 1927c c
 Xyleborus latecompressus Schedl, 1936g c
 Xyleborus latecornis Schedl, 1969a c
 Xyleborus latetruncatus Schedl, 1942a c
 Xyleborus laticaudatus Eggers, 1923a c
 Xyleborus laticeps Wood, 1977b c
 Xyleborus laticollis Blandford, 1896b c
 Xyleborus latipennis Schedl, 1976a c
 Xyleborus lativentris Schedl, 1942a c
 Xyleborus latus Eggers, 1923a c
 Xyleborus lenis Wood, 1974a c
 Xyleborus lepidus Bright, 1972d c
 Xyleborus leprosulus Schedl, 1936j c
 Xyleborus leverensis Browne, 1986c c
 Xyleborus lewekianus Eggers, 1923a c
 Xyleborus lewisi Blandford, 1894d c
 Xyleborus libra Eggers, 1923a c
 Xyleborus lignographus Schedl, 1953e c
 Xyleborus limatus Schedl, 1936h c
 Xyleborus linearicollis Schedl, 1937h c
 Xyleborus linearis Schedl, 1948f c
 Xyleborus lineatopunctatus Eggers, 1927b c
 Xyleborus lineatus Eggers, 1930d c
 Xyleborus littoralis Perkins, 1900 i c
 Xyleborus loebli Schedl, 1979b c
 Xyleborus longehirtus Nunberg, 1956d c
 Xyleborus longicollis Browne, 1977c c
 Xyleborus longideclivis Wood, 1968b c
 Xyleborus longidens Eggers, 1930d c
 Xyleborus longipennis Eggers, 1933b c
 Xyleborus longipilus Eggers, 1926b c
 Xyleborus longius Eggers, 1923a c
 Xyleborus longulus Schedl, 1966f c
 Xyleborus longus Eggers, 1927b c
 Xyleborus loricatus Schedl, 1933d c
 Xyleborus lubricus Schedl, 1941d c
 Xyleborus luctuosus Eggers, 1939b c
 Xyleborus lugubris Eggers, 1927c c
 Xyleborus luteus Schedl, 1937b c
 Xyleborus luzonicus Eggers, 1923a c

M

 Xyleborus macer Blandford, 1898b c
 Xyleborus machili Niisima, 1910a c
 Xyleborus madagascariensis Schaufuss, C.F.C., 1891 c
 Xyleborus magnificus Wood, 1992a c
 Xyleborus magnispinatus Beaver & Loyttyniemi (Beaver in), 1985a c
 Xyleborus magnus Niisima, 1910a c
 Xyleborus mahafali Schedl, 1953d c
 Xyleborus maiche Eggers, 1942c c
 Xyleborus major Wood & Bright, 1992 c
 Xyleborus majusculus Schedl, 1951m c
 Xyleborus malayensis Browne, 1981a c
 Xyleborus malgasicus Schedl, 1961e c
 Xyleborus malloti Eggers, 1930d c
 Xyleborus mamibillae Browne, 1970 c
 Xyleborus mancus Blandford, 1898a c
 Xyleborus mangoense Schedl, 1942a c
 Xyleborus maniensis Browne, 1981a c
 Xyleborus marcidus Schedl, 1965c c
 Xyleborus marginatulus Schedl, 1957d c
 Xyleborus marginatus Eggers, 1927c c
 Xyleborus marginicollis Schedl, 1936h c
 Xyleborus maronicus Eggers, 1933b c
 Xyleborus mascareniformis Eggers, 1927b c
 Xyleborus mascarensis Eichhoff, 1878b c
 Xyleborus mascarenus Hagedorn, 1908 c
 Xyleborus mauiensis Perkins, 1900 i c
 Xyleborus mediocris Schedl, 1942a c
 Xyleborus melanarius Schedl, 1978c c
 Xyleborus melancranis Beeson, 1930 c
 Xyleborus melas Eggers, 1927c c
 Xyleborus melli Schedl, 1938h c
 Xyleborus mendosus Schedl, 1965c c
 Xyleborus meridensis Wood, 1974a c
 Xyleborus meritus Wood, 1974a c
 Xyleborus mesoleiulus Schedl, 1979g c
 Xyleborus mesuae Eggers, 1930d c
 Xyleborus metacomans Eggers, 1930d c
 Xyleborus metacrucifer Browne, 1965a c
 Xyleborus metacuneolus Eggers, 1940d c
 Xyleborus metagermanus Schedl, 1951i c
 Xyleborus metanepotulus Eggers, 1939c c
 Xyleborus meuseli Reitter, 1905 c
 Xyleborus mexicanus Eggers, 1931a c
 Xyleborus micarius Wood, 1974a c
 Xyleborus micrographus Schedl, 1958b c
 Xyleborus mimicus Wood, 2007 c
 Xyleborus mimosae Schedl, 1957d c
 Xyleborus mimus Schedl, 1971e c
 Xyleborus mindanaensis Eggers, 1927c c
 Xyleborus minimus Schedl, 1955b c
 Xyleborus minor Swaine, J.M., 1910b c
 Xyleborus minusculus Eggers, 1923a c
 Xyleborus minutissimus Eggers, 1930d c
 Xyleborus misatoensis Nobuchi, 1981d c
 Xyleborus mitosomiformis Schedl, 1953d c
 Xyleborus mitosomipennis Schedl, 1953d c
 Xyleborus mitosomus Schedl, 1965c c
 Xyleborus mixtus Schedl, 1979g c
 Xyleborus miyazakiensis Murayama, 1936a c
 Xyleborus mkulumusius Schedl (Hagedorn in), 1962j c
 Xyleborus moestus Eggers, 1930d c
 Xyleborus molestulus Wood, 1975b c
 Xyleborus molokaiensis Perkins, 1900 i c
 Xyleborus moluccanus Browne, 1985b c
 Xyleborus monachus Blandford, 1898b c
 Xyleborus monographus (Fabricius, J.C., 1792) c g
 Xyleborus montanus Niisima, 1910a c
 Xyleborus monticolus Schedl, 1957d c
 Xyleborus morigerus Blandford, 1894b c
 Xyleborus morio Eggers, 1923a c
 Xyleborus morosus Schedl, 1962j c
 Xyleborus morstatti Hagedorn, 1912b c
 Xyleborus morulus Blandford, 1898b c
 Xyleborus mpangae Browne, 1965a c
 Xyleborus muasi Browne, 1961a c
 Xyleborus mucronatoides Schedl, 1975f c
 Xyleborus mucronatulus Eggers, 1930d c
 Xyleborus mucronatus Eggers, 1923a c
 Xyleborus mukunyae Schedl, 1957d c
 Xyleborus multigranosum Schedl, 1964f c
 Xyleborus multipunctatus Browne, 1980b c
 Xyleborus multipunctulus Browne, 1984d c
 Xyleborus multispinatus Eggers, 1920 c
 Xyleborus mumfordi Beeson, 1935b c
 Xyleborus muriceus Eichhoff, 1878b c
 Xyleborus murudensis Browne, 1965a c
 Xyleborus mus Eggers, 1930d c
 Xyleborus mussooriensis Eggers, 1930d c
 Xyleborus mustus Schedl, 1972b c
 Xyleborus mutabilis Schedl, 1935d c
 Xyleborus muticus Blandford, 1894d c
 Xyleborus mutilatus Blandford, 1894d c
 Xyleborus myllus Browne, 1986a c
 Xyleborus myristicae Schedl, 1939f c

N

 Xyleborus nagaoensis Murayama, 1934c c
 Xyleborus nakazawai Browne, 1984a c
 Xyleborus nameranus Murayama, 1954b c
 Xyleborus namibiae Schedl, 1982 c
 Xyleborus nandarivatus Schedl, 1950f c
 Xyleborus nanus Blandford, 1896f c
 Xyleborus natalensis Schaufuss, C.F.C., 1891 c
 Xyleborus neardus Schedl, 1950g c
 Xyleborus neglectus Schedl, 1957d c
 Xyleborus neivai Eggers, 1928c c
 Xyleborus neoadjunctus Schedl, 1967d c
 Xyleborus neocavipenne Schedl, 1977f c
 Xyleborus neocrucifer Schedl, 1955i c
 Xyleborus neocylindricus Schedl, 1942a c
 Xyleborus neogracilis Schedl, 1954b c
 Xyleborus neohybridus Schedl, 1942a c
 Xyleborus neoscabridus Schedl, 1972b c
 Xyleborus neosphenos Schedl, 1976a c
 Xyleborus neotruncatus Schedl, 1978c c
 Xyleborus nepocranus Schedl, 1939f c
 Xyleborus nepos Eggers, 1923a c
 Xyleborus nepotulomorphus Eggers, 1936e c
 Xyleborus nepotulus Eggers, 1923a c
 Xyleborus neptunus Schaufuss, C.F.C., 1891 c
 Xyleborus nesianus Beeson, 1940 c
 Xyleborus nevermanni Schedl, 1935d c
 Xyleborus niger Sampson, 1912 c
 Xyleborus nigericus Browne, 1970 c
 Xyleborus nigrescens Browne, 1980b c
 Xyleborus nigricollis Hagedorn, 1905b c
 Xyleborus nigripennis Schedl, 1951i c
 Xyleborus nigroaffinis Beeson, 1940 c
 Xyleborus nigropilosus Eggers, 1943c c
 Xyleborus nigrosetosus Schedl, 1939f c
 Xyleborus nitellus Browne, 1984d c
 Xyleborus nitens Browne, 1984d c
 Xyleborus nitidiloides Schedl, 1951i c
 Xyleborus nitidior Eggers, 1940d c
 Xyleborus nitidipennis Roubal, 1937 c
 Xyleborus nitidulus Eggers, 1927a c
 Xyleborus nitidus Schedl, 1951i c
 Xyleborus nodulosus Eggers, 1941b c
 Xyleborus norfolkensis Schedl, 1972b c
 Xyleborus nossi Schedl, 1961e c
 Xyleborus notatus Eggers, 1941a c
 Xyleborus novagranadensis Eggers, 1941a c
 Xyleborus novaguineanus Schedl, 1936g c
 Xyleborus novateutonicus Schedl, 1954b c
 Xyleborus novus Eggers, 1923a c
 Xyleborus noxius Sampson, 1913 c
 Xyleborus nsafukalae Schedl, 1957d c
 Xyleborus nubilus Samuelson, 1981 i c
 Xyleborus nudipennis Schedl, 1951i c
 Xyleborus nudus Nunberg, 1956d c
 Xyleborus nugax Schedl, 1939e c
 Xyleborus nuperus Bright, 1972d c
 Xyleborus nutans Schedl, 1942a c
 Xyleborus nuuanus Schedl, 1941f c
 Xyleborus nyssae Hopkins, 1915b c

O

 Xyleborus oahuensis Perkins, 1900 i c
 Xyleborus obesus LeConte, 1868 i c
 Xyleborus obiensis Browne, 1980a c
 Xyleborus oblicatus Schedl, 1980d c
 Xyleborus obliquesectum Eggers, 1927c c
 Xyleborus obliquus Bright, 1968b c
 Xyleborus oblongus Schedl, 1950d c
 Xyleborus obscurus Schedl, 1972q c
 Xyleborus obstipus Schedl, 1935f c
 Xyleborus obtrusus Schedl (Sampson in), 1960i c
 Xyleborus obtusatus Schedl, 1972m c
 Xyleborus obtusicollis Schedl, 1938g c
 Xyleborus obtusipennis Schedl (Eggers in), 1962j c
 Xyleborus obtusitruncatus Schedl, 1948f c
 Xyleborus obtusus Eggers, 1923a c
 Xyleborus ocellatus Wood, 1974a c
 Xyleborus octiesdentatus Murayama, 1931a c
 Xyleborus octospinosus Eggers, 1920 c
 Xyleborus ohausi Hagedorn, 1912a c
 Xyleborus ohnoi Browne, 1980a c
 Xyleborus ohtoensis Nobuchi, 1981d c
 Xyleborus okinosenensis Murayama, 1961b c
 Xyleborus okoumeensis Schedl, 1935f c
 Xyleborus ominosus Schedl, 1962j c
 Xyleborus omissus Schedl, 1961e c
 Xyleborus oneratus Schedl, 1976a c
 Xyleborus onerosus Schedl, 1942a c
 Xyleborus onoharaensis Murayama, 1934c c
 Xyleborus opacicauda Eggers, 1940d c
 Xyleborus opacithorax Schedl, 1937b c
 Xyleborus opalescens Schedl, 1937e c
 Xyleborus oparunus Beeson, 1940 c
 Xyleborus operosus Schedl, 1973e c
 Xyleborus opimatum Schedl, 1975a c
 Xyleborus opimulus Schedl, 1976a c
 Xyleborus opimus Wood, 1974a c
 Xyleborus optatus Schedl, 1973e c
 Xyleborus opulentus Schedl, 1975f c
 Xyleborus oralis Schedl, 1961e c
 Xyleborus orbatus Blandford, 1894d c
 Xyleborus orbicaudatus Eggers, 1940d c
 Xyleborus orbiculatus Schedl, 1942a c
 Xyleborus orbus Browne, 1966 c
 Xyleborus orientalis Eggers, 1933f c
 Xyleborus osumiensis Murayama, 1934c c
 Xyleborus ovalicollis Eggers, 1930d c
 Xyleborus ovatus Eggers, 1932d c

P

 Xyleborus pacificus Nunberg, 1959a c
 Xyleborus palatus Wood, 1974a c
 Xyleborus palembangensis Schedl, 1939f c
 Xyleborus pallidipennis Eggers, 1940d c
 Xyleborus pandae Schedl, 1957d c
 Xyleborus pandulus Wood, 1974a c
 Xyleborus papatrae Schedl, 1972i c
 Xyleborus papuanus Blandford, 1896b c
 Xyleborus paradoxus Schedl, 1972g c
 Xyleborus paraguayensis Schedl, 1948f c
 Xyleborus parallelocollis Eggers, 1933b c
 Xyleborus parallelus Eggers, 1936c c
 Xyleborus parcellus Wood, 1968b c
 Xyleborus pardous Eggers, 1943d c
 Xyleborus parinarie Schedl, 1962j c
 Xyleborus partitus Browne, 1974a c
 Xyleborus parvior Browne, 1981b c
 Xyleborus parvipunctatus Eggers, 1943a c
 Xyleborus parvispinosus Schedl, 1951i c
 Xyleborus parvulus Eichhoff, 1868c c
 Xyleborus parvus Eichhoff, 1878b c
 Xyleborus pecanus Hopkins, 1915b c
 Xyleborus pedella Schedl, 1969a c
 Xyleborus peguensis Eggers, 1930d c
 Xyleborus pele Samuelson, 1981 i c
 Xyleborus peliciformis Schedl, 1936j c
 Xyleborus pelliculosus Eichhoff, 1878b c
 Xyleborus penicillatus Hagedorn, 1910b c
 Xyleborus pentaclethrae Schedl, 1957d c
 Xyleborus perakensis Schedl, 1942a c
 Xyleborus peramploides Schedl, 1957d c
 Xyleborus peramplus Schedl, 1950d c
 Xyleborus perbrevis Schedl, 1951i c
 Xyleborus percorthyloides Schedl, 1957d c
 Xyleborus percorthylus Schedl, 1935f c
 Xyleborus percristatus Eggers, 1939a c
 Xyleborus percuneolus Schedl, 1951i c
 Xyleborus perdeclivis Schedl, 1957d c
 Xyleborus perdiligens Schedl, 1937b c
 Xyleborus perdix Schedl, 1939e c
 Xyleborus perebeae Blandford, 1898b c
 Xyleborus peregrinus Eggers, 1944c c
 Xyleborus perexiguus Schedl, 1971c c
 Xyleborus perforans (Wollaston, 1857) i c
 Xyleborus perlaetus Schedl, 1960h c
 Xyleborus perlongus Eggers, 1943a c
 Xyleborus permarginatus Schedl, 1933d c
 Xyleborus perminor Schedl, 1957d c
 Xyleborus perminutissimus Schedl, 1934d c
 Xyleborus pernitidus Schedl, 1954a c
 Xyleborus pernotus Schedl, 1934d c
 Xyleborus perorientalis Schedl, 1957d c
 Xyleborus perparva Sampson, 1922b c
 Xyleborus perpilosellum Schedl, 1935b c
 Xyleborus perplexus Schedl, 1969b c
 Xyleborus perpunctatus Schedl, 1971c c
 Xyleborus perpusillus Eggers, 1927b c
 Xyleborus perquadrispinosus Schedl, 1957d c
 Xyleborus persimilis Eggers, 1927c c
 Xyleborus persphenos Schedl, 1970a c
 Xyleborus perspinidens Schedl, 1957d c
 Xyleborus perspinifer Schedl, 1957d c
 Xyleborus pertortuosus Schedl, 1942a c
 Xyleborus pertuberculatus Eggers, 1940d c
 Xyleborus peruvianus Schedl, 1951m c
 Xyleborus perversus Hagedorn, 1905a c
 Xyleborus pfeili Wood & Bright, 1992 c b
 Xyleborus philippinensis Eichhoff, 1878b c
 Xyleborus picinus Schedl, 1957d c
 Xyleborus pileatulus Schedl, 1975f c
 Xyleborus pilifer Eggers, 1923a c
 Xyleborus pilipenne Eggers, 1940d c
 Xyleborus pilipunctatus Browne, 1966 c
 Xyleborus pilosellus Schedl, 1957d c
 Xyleborus pilosulum Eggers, 1927c c
 Xyleborus pilosus Eggers, 1923a c
 Xyleborus pinguis Schedl, 1961e c
 Xyleborus pini Eichhoff, 1868a c
 Xyleborus pinicola Eggers, 1930d c
 Xyleborus pinivorus Browne, 1980a c
 Xyleborus pithecolobius Schedl, 1937c c
 Xyleborus pityogenes Schedl, 1936g c
 Xyleborus plagiatus LeConte, 1868 c
 Xyleborus planicollis Zimmermann, 1868 i c
 Xyleborus planipennis Schedl, 1955b c
 Xyleborus planodeclivis Browne, 1974a c
 Xyleborus planotruncatum Schedl, 1942a c
 Xyleborus platyurus Browne, 1984f c
 Xyleborus pleiades Samuelson, 1981 i c
 Xyleborus politus Hagedorn, 1905a c
 Xyleborus polyalthiae Schedl, 1952i c
 Xyleborus polyodon Eggers, 1923a c
 Xyleborus pometianus Schedl, 1939e c
 Xyleborus popondettae Browne, 1970 c
 Xyleborus populi Swaine, J.M., 1917 c
 Xyleborus posticegranulatus Schedl, 1938h c
 Xyleborus posticepilosus Schedl, 1951i c
 Xyleborus posticespinatum Eggers, 1940c c
 Xyleborus posticestriatus Eggers, 1939c c
 Xyleborus posticoides Schedl, 1948f c
 Xyleborus posticus Eichhoff, 1869b c
 Xyleborus potens Schedl, 1964c c
 Xyleborus pourriensis Schedl, 1950h c
 Xyleborus praecursor Schedl, 1962j c
 Xyleborus praestans Wood, 1980b c
 Xyleborus praeusta Eggers, 1923a c
 Xyleborus praevius Blandford, 1894d c
 Xyleborus princeps Blandford, 1898b c
 Xyleborus principalis Eichhoff, 1878b c
 Xyleborus priscus Eggers, 1920 c
 Xyleborus pristis Wood, 1974a c
 Xyleborus privatus Beeson, 1930 c
 Xyleborus procer Eichhoff, 1878b c
 Xyleborus procerior Schedl, 1942c c
 Xyleborus procerrimus Schedl, 1969a c
 Xyleborus procerrissimus Schedl, 1942a c
 Xyleborus productus Hagedorn, 1905a c
 Xyleborus profondus Schedl, 1961e c
 Xyleborus prolatus Wood, 1974a c
 Xyleborus prolixus Schedl, 1962j c
 Xyleborus pronunciatus Eggers, 1936e c
 Xyleborus propinquus Eichhoff, 1869b c
 Xyleborus protensus Eggers, 1930d c
 Xyleborus protii Browne, 1984d c
 Xyleborus protinus Wood, 1974a c
 Xyleborus proximus Eggers, 1943c c
 Xyleborus pruinosulus Beaver & Browne (Browne in), 1978 c
 Xyleborus pruinosum Blandford, 1896b c
 Xyleborus psaltes Schedl, 1954e c
 Xyleborus pseudoacuminatus Wood, 2007 c
 Xyleborus pseudoambasius Schedl, 1954e c
 Xyleborus pseudoangustatus Schedl, 1948g c
 Xyleborus pseudobarbatus Schedl, 1942a c
 Xyleborus pseudobrasiliensis Eggers, 1941a c
 Xyleborus pseudocitri Schedl, 1959a c
 Xyleborus pseudococcotrypes Eggers, 1941a c
 Xyleborus pseudocolossus Schedl, 1942d c
 Xyleborus pseudocomans Eggers, 1930d c
 Xyleborus pseudocrucifer Schedl, 1939a c
 Xyleborus pseudocylindricus Eggers, 1927b c
 Xyleborus pseudoferox Wood, 2007 c
 Xyleborus pseudofoersteri Schedl, 1942a c
 Xyleborus pseudogracilis Schedl, 1937h c
 Xyleborus pseudohystrix Schedl, 1959p c
 Xyleborus pseudomajor Schedl, 1951i c
 Xyleborus pseudopilifer Schedl, 1936d c
 Xyleborus pseudopityogenes Eggers, 1943e c
 Xyleborus pseudoprocer Schedl, 1948f c
 Xyleborus pseudopunctulus Schedl, 1942a c
 Xyleborus pseudorudis Schedl, 1951i c
 Xyleborus pseudosolidus Schedl, 1936g c
 Xyleborus pseudosolitarius Eggers, 1933b c
 Xyleborus pseudotenuis Schedl, 1936i c
 Xyleborus pseudovalidus Eggers, 1925 c
 Xyleborus puberulus Blandford, 1896b c
 Xyleborus pubescens Zimmermann, 1868 i c b
 Xyleborus pubifer Schedl, 1972m c
 Xyleborus pubipennis Schedl, 1974c c
 Xyleborus puer Eggers, 1923a c
 Xyleborus pulchripes Schedl, 1958f c
 Xyleborus pulcnerrimus Schedl, 1948d c
 Xyleborus pulla Schedl, 1952b c
 Xyleborus pumilus Eggers, 1923a c
 Xyleborus punctatopilosum Schedl, 1936g c
 Xyleborus punctatum Eggers, 1923a c
 Xyleborus punctilicolle Schedl, 1942a c
 Xyleborus punctipennis LeConte, 1878b c
 Xyleborus punctulatus Kurenzov, 1948a c
 Xyleborus pusillus Schedl, 1961f c
 Xyleborus pusio Eggers, 1941a c
 Xyleborus putputensis Browne, 1986a c
 Xyleborus pygmaeus Eggers, 1940d c

Q-R

 Xyleborus quadraticollis Eggers, 1923a c
 Xyleborus quadratus Blandford, 1898b c
 Xyleborus quadricostata Schedl, 1942d c
 Xyleborus quadricuspis Schedl, 1942d c
 Xyleborus quadridens Eggers, 1930d c
 Xyleborus quadridentatus Schedl, 1957d c
 Xyleborus quadrisignatus Schedl, 1972m c
 Xyleborus quadrispinis Schedl, 1953d c
 Xyleborus quadrispinosulus Eggers, 1923a c
 Xyleborus quadrispinosus Eichhoff, 1878b c
 Xyleborus quasimodo Browne, 1980e c
 Xyleborus quercicola Eggers, 1926b c
 Xyleborus quercus Kurenzov, 1948a c
 Xyleborus rameus Schedl, 1940b c
 Xyleborus ramulorum Schedl, 1957d c
 Xyleborus rapandus Schedl, 1942c c
 Xyleborus rapanus Beeson, 1940 c
 Xyleborus raucus Schedl, 1950c c
 Xyleborus recidens Sampson, 1923b c
 Xyleborus reconditus Schedl, 1963f c
 Xyleborus repositus Schedl, 1942a c
 Xyleborus resecans Eggers, 1930d c
 Xyleborus resectus Eggers, 1927b c
 Xyleborus resinosus Schedl, 1939a c
 Xyleborus restrictus Schedl, 1939f c
 Xyleborus retrusus Schedl, 1940c c
 Xyleborus retusicollis Zimmermann, 1868 c
 Xyleborus retusiformis Schedl, 1936j c
 Xyleborus retusus Eichhoff, 1868c c
 Xyleborus reunionis Schedl, 1961e c
 Xyleborus revocabile Schedl, 1942c c
 Xyleborus rhodesianus Eggers, 1936c c
 Xyleborus ricini Eggers, 1932d c
 Xyleborus riehli Eichhoff, 1878b c
 Xyleborus rileyi Hopkins, 1915b c
 Xyleborus rimulosus Schedl, 1959a c
 Xyleborus robertsi Browne, 1963b c
 Xyleborus robustipennis Schedl, 1954c c
 Xyleborus robustulus Schedl, 1957d c
 Xyleborus robustus Schedl, 1933e c
 Xyleborus rodgeri Beeson, 1930 c
 Xyleborus rosseli Schedl, 1975m c
 Xyleborus rothkirchi Eggers, 1920 c
 Xyleborus rotundicollis Browne, 1984f c
 Xyleborus ruandae Schedl, 1957d c
 Xyleborus ruber Eichhoff, 1868c c
 Xyleborus rubricollis Eichhoff, 1875 c
 Xyleborus rudis Eggers, 1930d c
 Xyleborus rufipes Eggers, 1933b c
 Xyleborus rufithorax Eichhoff, 1869b c
 Xyleborus rufobrunneus Eggers, 1929e c
 Xyleborus rufoniger Schedl, 1934d c
 Xyleborus rufonitidum Schedl, 1951i c
 Xyleborus rufopiceus Eggers, 1932d c
 Xyleborus rufus Schedl, 1951i c
 Xyleborus rugatus Blackburn, 1885 i c
 Xyleborus rugicollis Blandford, 1898b c
 Xyleborus rugipennis Schedl, 1953c c
 Xyleborus rugosipennis Schedl, 1963f c
 Xyleborus rugosus Eggers, 1920 c
 Xyleborus rugulosipes Wood, 2007 c
 Xyleborus rugulosus Eggers, 1922c c
 Xyleborus russulus Schedl, 1942c c
 Xyleborus rusticus Wood, 1974a c

S

 Xyleborus sacchari Hopkins, 1915b c
 Xyleborus sakalava Schedl, 1953d c
 Xyleborus sakoae Schedl, 1961e c
 Xyleborus salvini Blandford, 1898b c
 Xyleborus sampsoni Donisthorpe, 1940 c
 Xyleborus sandragotoensis Schedl, 1961e c
 Xyleborus sanguinicollis Blandford, 1898b c
 Xyleborus sarawakensis Eggers, 1923a c
 Xyleborus sartor Schedl, 1961e c
 Xyleborus satoi Schedl, 1961e c
 Xyleborus sauropteroides Schedl, 1970d c
 Xyleborus sauropterus Schedl, 1953d c
 Xyleborus sayi (Hopkins, 1915) i c
 Xyleborus scaber Schedl, 1948f c
 Xyleborus scabratus Schedl, 1941 i c
 Xyleborus scabricollis Wood & Bright, 1992 c
 Xyleborus scabridus Schedl, 1952i c
 Xyleborus scabrior Schedl, 1954e c
 Xyleborus scabripennis Blandford, 1896b c
 Xyleborus scalaris Schedl, 1935d c
 Xyleborus scalptor Schedl, 1961e c
 Xyleborus scapulare Schedl, 1942a c
 Xyleborus schaufussi Blandford, 1894d c
 Xyleborus schedli Eggers, 1934a c
 Xyleborus schildi Schedl, 1935d c
 Xyleborus schizolobius Schedl, 1950i c
 Xyleborus schlichi Stebbing, E.P., 1914 c
 Xyleborus schoenherri Schedl, 1981a c
 Xyleborus schoutedeni Eggers, 1927a c
 Xyleborus schreineri Eggers, 1920 c
 Xyleborus schultzei Schedl, 1951i c
 Xyleborus schwarzi Hopkins, 1915b c
 Xyleborus sclerocaryae Schedl, 1962h c
 Xyleborus scobinatus Hagedorn, 1910b c
 Xyleborus scopulorum Hopkins, 1915b c
 Xyleborus scorpius Schedl, 1942a c
 Xyleborus sculptilis Schedl, 1964g c
 Xyleborus seiryorensis Murayama, 1930b c
 Xyleborus sejugatus Schedl, 1942a c
 Xyleborus semicarinatus Schedl, 1942c c
 Xyleborus semicircularis Schedl, 1973e c
 Xyleborus semicostatus Schedl, 1948f c
 Xyleborus semigranosus Blandford, 1896b c
 Xyleborus semigranulatus Schedl, 1931c c
 Xyleborus seminitens Blandford, 1895a c
 Xyleborus semiopacus Eichhoff, 1878b c
 Xyleborus semipilosus Eggers, 1932d c
 Xyleborus semipolitus Schedl, 1951i c
 Xyleborus semipunctatus Eggers, 1933b c
 Xyleborus semirufus Schedl, 1959a c
 Xyleborus semistriatus Schedl, 1971c c
 Xyleborus semitruncatus Schedl, 1942d c
 Xyleborus senchalensis Beeson, 1930 c
 Xyleborus sentosus Eichhoff, 1868c c
 Xyleborus separandus Schedl, 1971c c
 Xyleborus septentrionalis Niisima, 1909 c
 Xyleborus sereinuus Eggers, 1923a c
 Xyleborus seriatus Blandford, 1894d c b
 Xyleborus serratus Swaine, J.M., 1910b c
 Xyleborus setosus Eichhoff, 1868c c
 Xyleborus setulosus Eggers, 1940d c
 Xyleborus sexdentatus Eggers, 1940d c
 Xyleborus sexnotatus Schedl, 1970e c
 Xyleborus sexspinatum Schedl, 1935f c
 Xyleborus sextuberculatus Schedl, 1952a c
 Xyleborus sharpae Hopkins, 1915b c
 Xyleborus sharpi Blandford, 1898b c
 Xyleborus shionomisakiensis Murayama, 1951a c
 Xyleborus shiva Maiti & Saha, 1986 c
 Xyleborus shoreae (Stebbing, E.P., 1909b) c
 Xyleborus sibsagaricus Eggers, 1930d c
 Xyleborus siclus Schedl, 1936j c
 Xyleborus siginis Eggers (Hagedorn in), 1920 c
 Xyleborus signatipennis Schedl, 1961e c
 Xyleborus signatus Schedl, 1948f c
 Xyleborus signiceps Schedl, 1962j c
 Xyleborus signifer Schedl, 1968b c
 Xyleborus silvestris Beeson, 1929 c
 Xyleborus similans Eggers, 1940c c
 Xyleborus similaris Schedl, 1965c c
 Xyleborus similis Eggers, 1927c c
 Xyleborus simillimus Perkins, 1900 i c
 Xyleborus simulatus Bright, 1972d c
 Xyleborus sinensis Eggers, 1941b c
 Xyleborus siobanus Eggers, 1923a c
 Xyleborus siporanus Hagedorn, 1910b c
 Xyleborus sirambeanus Eggers, 1923a c
 Xyleborus sisyrnophorum Hagedorn, 1910b c
 Xyleborus sobrinus Eichhoff, 1875 c
 Xyleborus societatis Beeson, 1935a c
 Xyleborus solidus Eichhoff, 1868c c
 Xyleborus solitariceps Schedl, 1954b c
 Xyleborus solitariformis Schedl, 1976a c
 Xyleborus solitarinus Schedl, 1950i c
 Xyleborus solitaripennis Schedl, 1976a c
 Xyleborus solitarius Hagedorn, 1905a c
 Xyleborus solomonicus Schedl, 1970b c
 Xyleborus soltaui Hopkins, 1915b c
 Xyleborus solutus Schedl, 1962j c
 Xyleborus sordicaudulus Eggers, 1927c c
 Xyleborus sparsegranulosus Kirkendall & Jordal, 2006 c
 Xyleborus sparsipilosus Eggers, 1933b c
 Xyleborus sparsus LeConte, 1868 c
 Xyleborus spathipennis Eichhoff, 1868c c
 Xyleborus spatulatus Blandford, 1896b c
 Xyleborus speciosus Schedl, 1975e c
 Xyleborus sphenos Sampson, 1912 c
 Xyleborus spicatulus Browne, 1986c c
 Xyleborus spicatus Browne, 1986a c
 Xyleborus spiculatulus Schedl, 1965c c
 Xyleborus spiculatus Schaufuss, C.F.C., 1891 c
 Xyleborus spinachius Schedl, 1955b c
 Xyleborus spinatus Eggers, 1923a c
 Xyleborus spinibarbe Schedl, 1955i c
 Xyleborus spinicornis Schedl, 1975f c
 Xyleborus spinidens Eggers, 1920 c
 Xyleborus spinifer Eggers, 1920 c
 Xyleborus spiniger Schedl, 1954b c
 Xyleborus spinipennis Eggers, 1930d c
 Xyleborus spinipes Schedl, 1957d c
 Xyleborus spinosulus Schedl, 1934g c
 Xyleborus spinosus Schaufuss, C.F.C., 1891 c
 Xyleborus spinulosus Blandford, 1898 i c b
 Xyleborus splendidus Schaufuss, C.F.C., 1897b c
 Xyleborus squamatilis Schedl, 1955b c
 Xyleborus squamulatus Eichhoff, 1869b c
 Xyleborus squamulosus Eggers, 1923a c
 Xyleborus starki Nunberg, 1956d c
 Xyleborus stenographus Schedl, 1971c c
 Xyleborus striatotruncatus Schedl, 1936j c
 Xyleborus striatulus Browne, 1980c c
 Xyleborus strohmeyeri Schedl, 1975e c
 Xyleborus strombiformis Schedl, 1971c c
 Xyleborus strombosiopsis Schedl, 1957d c
 Xyleborus suaui Schedl, 1973f c
 Xyleborus subadjunctus Schedl, 1950d c
 Xyleborus subaffinis Eggers, 1933b c
 Xyleborus subagnatus Schedl (Eggers in), 1979c c
 Xyleborus subasperulus Eggers, 1935c c
 Xyleborus subcarinulatus Eggers, 1932d c
 Xyleborus subcostatus Eichhoff, 1869a c
 Xyleborus subcrenulatus Eggers, 1932d c
 Xyleborus subcribrosus Blandford, 1896b c
 Xyleborus subdentatulus Browne, 1986a c
 Xyleborus subdentatus Browne, 1974b c
 Xyleborus subdepressus Rey, 1885 c
 Xyleborus subdolosus Schedl, 1942d c
 Xyleborus subductus Schedl, 1976a c
 Xyleborus subemarginatus Eggers, 1940d c
 Xyleborus subgranosus Schedl, 1962j c
 Xyleborus subgranulatus Eggers, 1930d c
 Xyleborus subitus Schedl, 1948f c
 Xyleborus sublinearis Eggers, 1940d c
 Xyleborus sublongus Eggers, 1927c c
 Xyleborus submarginatus Blandford, 1896b c
 Xyleborus submolestus Schedl, 1941d c
 Xyleborus submontanus Schedl, 1960i c
 Xyleborus subnepotulus Eggers, 1930d c
 Xyleborus subobtusum Schedl, 1942a c
 Xyleborus subparallelus Eggers, 1940d c
 Xyleborus subplanatus Eggers, 1943a c
 Xyleborus subpruinosus Browne, 1986a c
 Xyleborus subsimiliformis Eggers, 1939b c
 Xyleborus subsimilis Eggers, 1930d c
 Xyleborus subspinosus Eggers, 1930d c
 Xyleborus subsulcatus Eggers, 1927a c
 Xyleborus subtilis Schedl, 1970e c
 Xyleborus subtruncatus Schedl, 1972m c
 Xyleborus subtuberculatus Eggers, 1927a c
 Xyleborus sulcaticeps Schedl, 1962j c
 Xyleborus sulcatulus Eggers, 1939b c
 Xyleborus sulcatus Eggers, 1930d c
 Xyleborus sulcicauda Schedl, 1972b c
 Xyleborus sulcinoides Schedl, 1974d c
 Xyleborus sulcipenne Eggers, 1932d c
 Xyleborus sumatranus Hagedorn, 1908 c
 Xyleborus sundaensis Eggers, 1923a c
 Xyleborus superbulus Schedl, 1958k c
 Xyleborus superbus Schedl, 1942c c
 Xyleborus sus Schedl, 1973e c
 Xyleborus suturalis Eggers, 1930d c
 Xyleborus swezeyi Beeson, 1929 c
 Xyleborus syzygii Nunberg, 1959c c
 Xyleborus szentivanyi Schedl, 1968e c

T

 Xyleborus taboensis Schedl, 1952c c
 Xyleborus tachygraphus Zimmermann, 1868 c
 Xyleborus taichuensis Schedl, 1952c c
 Xyleborus taitonus Eggers, 1939c c
 Xyleborus taiwanensis Browne, 1980b c
 Xyleborus takeharai Browne, 1983a c
 Xyleborus takinoyensis Murayama, 1953b c
 Xyleborus talumalai Browne, 1966 c
 Xyleborus tanganjikaensis Schedl, 1937b c
 Xyleborus tanganus Hagedorn, 1910b c
 Xyleborus tanibe Schedl, 1965c c
 Xyleborus tantalus Schedl, 1941 i c
 Xyleborus tapatapaoensis Schedl, 1951k c
 Xyleborus taxicornis Schedl, 1971c c
 Xyleborus tecleae Schedl, 1957e c
 Xyleborus tectonae Nunberg, 1956d c
 Xyleborus tectus Schedl, 1972h c
 Xyleborus tegalensis Eggers, 1923a c
 Xyleborus temetiuicus Beeson, 1935b c
 Xyleborus tenebrosus Schedl, 1937b c
 Xyleborus tenella Schedl, 1959a c
 Xyleborus tenellus Schedl, 1957d c
 Xyleborus teninabani Browne, 1986c c
 Xyleborus tenuigraphum Schedl, 1953e c
 Xyleborus tenuipennis Browne, 1974a c
 Xyleborus tenuis Schedl, 1948f c
 Xyleborus tereticollis Schedl, 1951i c
 Xyleborus terminatus Eggers, 1930d c
 Xyleborus testudo Eggers, 1939c c
 Xyleborus tetracanthus Beeson, 1941 c
 Xyleborus theae Eggers, 1940d c
 Xyleborus timidus Schedl, 1973f c
 Xyleborus tinnitus Schedl, 1941d c
 Xyleborus titubanter Schedl, 1948h c
 Xyleborus todo Kono, 1938b c
 Xyleborus tolimanus Eggers, 1928c c
 Xyleborus tomentosus Eggers, 1939b c
 Xyleborus tomicoides Eggers, 1923a c
 Xyleborus tonkinensis Schedl, 1934c c
 Xyleborus tonsus Wood, 1977b c
 Xyleborus torquatus Eichhoff, 1868c c
 Xyleborus tortuosus Schedl, 1942a c
 Xyleborus transitus Schedl, 1962j c
 Xyleborus trapezicollis Schedl, 1971c c
 Xyleborus trepanicauda Eggers, 1923a c
 Xyleborus triangi Schedl, 1958b c
 Xyleborus triangularis Schedl, 1975f c
 Xyleborus tribulatus Wood, 1974a c
 Xyleborus trinidadensis Schedl, 1961a c
 Xyleborus trispinatus Browne, 1981a c
 Xyleborus tristiculus Wood, 1975b c
 Xyleborus tristis Eggers, 1930d c
 Xyleborus triton Schaufuss, C.F.C., 1905 c
 Xyleborus trolaki Schedl, 1939e c
 Xyleborus tropicus Hagedorn, 1910b c
 Xyleborus truncatellus Schedl, 1951i c
 Xyleborus truncaticauda Browne, 1984d c
 Xyleborus truncatiferus Schedl, 1955b c
 Xyleborus truncatiformis Eggers, 1923a c
 Xyleborus truncatipennis Schedl, 1961f c
 Xyleborus truncatulus Schedl, 1957d c
 Xyleborus truncatus Sharp, D., 1885 c
 Xyleborus trux Schedl, 1937b c
 Xyleborus tsukubanus Murayama, 1954b c
 Xyleborus tuberculifer Eggers, 1923a c
 Xyleborus tuberculosissimum Eggers, 1940d c
 Xyleborus tuberculosus Browne, 1981b c
 Xyleborus tumidus Schedl, 1975f c
 Xyleborus tumucensis Hagedorn, 1905a c
 Xyleborus tunggali Schedl, 1936j c
 Xyleborus turbineus Sampson, 1923b c
 Xyleborus turgidus Schedl, 1962j c
 Xyleborus turraeanthus Schedl, 1957d c

U-Z

 Xyleborus ugandaensis Schedl, 1957e c
 Xyleborus umbratulus Schedl, 1975g c
 Xyleborus umbratum Eggers, 1941b c
 Xyleborus uncatus Schedl, 1970e c
 Xyleborus undatus Schedl, 1974c c
 Xyleborus undulata Sampson, 1919 c
 Xyleborus unimodus Beeson, 1929 c
 Xyleborus uniseriatus Eggers, 1936e c
 Xyleborus upoluensis Schedl, 1951k c
 Xyleborus urichi Sampson, 1912 c
 Xyleborus ursa Eggers, 1923a c
 Xyleborus ursinus Hagedorn, 1908 c
 Xyleborus ursulus Eggers, 1923a c
 Xyleborus ursus Eggers, 1923a c
 Xyleborus usagaricus Eggers, 1922b c
 Xyleborus usitata Schedl, 1942c c
 Xyleborus usticus Wood, 1968b c
 Xyleborus ustulatus Eggers (Hagedorn in), 1920 c
 Xyleborus ustus Schedl, 1957d c
 Xyleborus vafra Schedl, 1957e c
 Xyleborus vagabundus Schedl, 1948f c
 Xyleborus vagans Schedl, 1977f c
 Xyleborus validicornis Schedl, 1950f c
 Xyleborus validus Eichhoff, 1875 i c
 Xyleborus vanrynae Browne, 1973a c
 Xyleborus variabilis Schedl, 1948f c
 Xyleborus varians Fabricius, 1801 g
 Xyleborus variipennis Schedl, 1971c c
 Xyleborus varulus Wood, 1974a c
 Xyleborus velatus Sampson, 1913 c
 Xyleborus venustulus Schedl, 1969b c
 Xyleborus verax Schedl, 1939f c
 Xyleborus vernaculus Schedl, 1975f c
 Xyleborus versicolor Sampson, 1921 c
 Xyleborus vespatorius Schedl, 1931c c
 Xyleborus vestigator Schedl, 1973e c
 Xyleborus vexans Schedl, 1972g c
 Xyleborus viaticus Schedl, 1974d c
 Xyleborus vicarius Eichhoff, 1875 c
 Xyleborus vicinus LeConte, 1874a c
 Xyleborus viduus Eichhoff, 1878 i c b
 Xyleborus vigilans Schedl, 1939f c
 Xyleborus villosulus Blandford, 1898b c
 Xyleborus villosus Schedl, 1948f c
 Xyleborus viruensis Browne, 1984a c
 Xyleborus vismiae Wood, 1974a c
 Xyleborus vitiosus Schedl, 1940a c
 Xyleborus voarotrae Schedl, 1961e c
 Xyleborus vochysiae Kirkendall, 2006 c
 Xyleborus volutus Wood, 2007 c
 Xyleborus volvulus (Fabricius, 1775) i c g b
 Xyleborus vulcanus Perkins, 1900 i c
 Xyleborus vulpina Schedl, 1942a c
 Xyleborus wakayamensis Nobuchi, 1981d c
 Xyleborus wallacei Blandford, 1896b c
 Xyleborus webbi Hopkins, 1915b c
 Xyleborus whitfordiodendrus Schedl, 1942a c
 Xyleborus whitteni Beeson, 1935b c
 Xyleborus wilderi Beeson, 1929 c
 Xyleborus woodi Schedl, 1979j c
 Xyleborus xanthophyllus Schedl, 1942a c
 Xyleborus xanthopus Eichhoff, 1868c c
 Xyleborus xylocranellus Schedl, 1931c c
 Xyleborus xylographus (Say, 1826) i c g b
 Xyleborus xyloteroides Eggers, 1939c c
 Xyleborus xylotrupes Schedl, 1962j c
 Xyleborus yakushimanus Murayama, 1955 c
 Xyleborus zicsii Schedl, 1967e c

Data sources: i = ITIS, c = Catalogue of Life, g = GBIF, b = Bugguide.net

References

Xyleborus